Events in the year 1455 in Norway.

Incumbents
Monarch: Christian I

Events
1-2 September – Hanseatic merchants attacked and destroyed Munkeliv Abbey in Bergen. Olav Nilsson, commander of Bergenhus Fortress was killed in the attack together with Leif Thor Olafsson, Bishop of Bergen and about 60 other Norwegians.

Births
Knut Alvsson, nobleman and landowner (d. 1502)

Deaths
1 September – Leif Thor Olafsson, bishop 
2 September – Olav Nilsson, nobleman, land owner (born c. 1400).

References

Norway